Leeds A.F.C. was an English football club based in Leeds, West Yorkshire, England.

History
The club was a founder member of the first incarnation of the Yorkshire Football League in 1897, but at the end of the season they were asked by the owners of their rented Headingley home to pay more rent, and the club was wound up.

References

Defunct football clubs in England
Yorkshire Football League
Defunct football clubs in West Yorkshire
Association football clubs disestablished in 1898
Association football clubs established in 1894